The 1792 United States presidential election in Delaware took place between November 2 and December 5, 1792 as part of the 1792 United States presidential election. The state legislature chose three members of the Electoral College, each of whom, under the provisions of the Constitution prior to the passage of the Twelfth Amendment, cast two votes for President.

Delaware's three electors each cast one vote for the incumbent, George Washington, and one vote for John Adams, the incumbent Vice President.

Results

See also
 United States presidential elections in Delaware

References

Delaware
1792
1792 Delaware elections